The Lewis Textile Museum was bequeathed to the people of Blackburn by a local cotton industrialist, Thomas Boys Lewis (1869–1942). The Lewis Textile Museum was closed in 2006 and a new gallery with its collection of looms and textile machinery was moved to Blackburn Museum and Art Gallery. The gallery which now houses the exhibits at the main Museum & Art Gallery was named CottonTown and opened in April 2007 by Jack Straw, the local Labour MP.

The closure of the Lewis Textile Museum  caused surprise which the local paper, the Lancashire Telegraph reported.

In 2006 the building of the Lewis Textile Museum, was planned to become a drugs centre although this was met with local uproar.

See also
 Blackburn Museum and Art Gallery

References

External links
 Entry in 24 Hour Museum
 Visit NorthWest information
 Thomas Boys Lewis

Art museums disestablished in 2006
Art museums and galleries in Lancashire
Buildings and structures in Blackburn
Defunct museums in England
History of Blackburn with Darwen
Museums in Lancashire
2006 disestablishments in England
Grade II listed buildings in Lancashire
Textile museums in the United Kingdom